Borden is a small town in the Great Southern region of Western Australia. At the 2006 census, Borden and the surrounding area had a population of 164.

The town was established as a siding on the railway line between Gnowangerup and Ongerup and is named after Canadian Prime Minister Robert Laird Borden. The railway opened for business on 6 January 1913 and closed on 13 October 1957.

The area near Paper Collar Creek near where the town stands was a meeting point for sandalwood cutters in the 1840s for when they used to head to the port at Albany.

In 1916,  of land was set aside for a townsite. Although the site had not been surveyed J.G. Jenkins had already erected the first building containing dwelling, dining, refreshment and assembly rooms. Another man, J. Copeland was also constructing a building at this time. A telephone connection with Gnowangerup had also been established and mail was being received twice a week by train.

The local agricultural hall, constructed of jarrah and cast iron, was opened in 1928 by the Minister of Lands, Michael H. Troy. Local members H. Stewart and Charles Wittenoom were also present.

The main industry in town is wheat farming, with the town being a Cooperative Bulk Handling receival site. The receival bins are able to handle  of grain during harvest times. In 2017 the receival site was inundated with floodwaters following a heavy rain event. The harvest had been a new record so that large amounts of grain were stored in overflow bins.

References

Towns in Western Australia
Great Southern (Western Australia)
Grain receival points of Western Australia